Kurt Van De Paar (born 10 January 1978) is a Belgian former footballer who played as a midfielder. He represented R.S.C. Anderlecht in his native country, after which he went abroad to play for FC Twente in the Netherlands and Trabzonspor in Turkey.

Honours
FC Twente
 KNVB Cup: 2000–01

References

1978 births
Living people
Belgian footballers
Association football midfielders
R.S.C. Anderlecht players
FC Twente players
Trabzonspor footballers
Belgian Pro League players
Eredivisie players
Süper Lig players
Belgian expatriate footballers
Expatriate footballers in the Netherlands
Belgian expatriate sportspeople in the Netherlands
Expatriate footballers in Turkey
Belgian expatriate sportspeople in Turkey
People from Beringen, Belgium
Footballers from Limburg (Belgium)